Lincolnville is a city in Marion County, Kansas, United States.  As of the 2020 census, the population of the city was 168.  It is located northeast of Marion, west of the intersection of U.S. Route 77 (aka U.S. Route 56) highway and 290th Street next to the Union Pacific Railroad.

History

Early history

For many millennia, the Great Plains of North America was inhabited by nomadic Native Americans.  From the 16th century to 18th century, the Kingdom of France claimed ownership of large parts of North America.  In 1762, after the French and Indian War, France secretly ceded New France to Spain, per the Treaty of Fontainebleau.

19th century
In 1802, Spain returned most of the land to France.  In 1803, most of the land for modern day Kansas was acquired by the United States from France as part of the 828,000 square mile Louisiana Purchase for 2.83 cents per acre.

In 1854, the Kansas Territory was organized, then in 1861 Kansas became the 34th U.S. state.  In 1855, Marion County was established within the Kansas Territory, which included the land for modern day Lincolnville.

The first settlers to the area were Heman Deal (1860) and Thomas Wise, Jr (1863).  A post office was established in Lincolnville on December 31, 1868.

The first Lincolnville plat was filed by Robert C McAllister on May 18, 1872, but the patent from the United States government was not granted until August 23, 1878. President Abraham Lincoln is the city's namesake.

In 1887, the Chicago, Kansas and Nebraska Railway built a branch line north-south from Herington through Lincolnville to Caldwell.  It foreclosed in 1891 and was taken over by Chicago, Rock Island and Pacific Railway, which shut down in 1980 and reorganized as Oklahoma, Kansas and Texas Railroad, merged in 1988 with Missouri Pacific Railroad, and finally merged in 1997 with Union Pacific Railroad.  Most locals still refer to this railroad as the "Rock Island".

Geography
Lincolnville is located at coordinates 38.4933471, -96.9600163 in the scenic Flint Hills and Great Plains of the state of Kansas.

Climate
The climate in this area is characterized by hot, humid summers and generally mild to cool winters.  According to the Köppen Climate Classification system, Lincolnville has a humid subtropical climate, abbreviated "Cfa" on climate maps.

Area events
 Octoberfest, first Saturday in October.

Area attractions
Lincolnville has two buildings listed on the National Register of Historic Places (NRHP).
 Bethel School (NRHP), 5.25 miles east of Lincolnville on 290th Street.
 Island Field Ranch House (NRHP), 3.5 miles south of Lincolnville on U.S. Route 77.

Demographics

2010 census
As of the census of 2010, there were 203 people, 81 households, and 54 families residing in the city. The racial makeup of the city was 95.6% White, 2.5% Native American, 1.5% from other races, and 0.5% from two or more races. Hispanic or Latino of any race were 5.4% of the population.

There were 81 households, of which 39.5% had children under the age of 18 living with them, 44.4% were married couples living together, 16.0% had a female householder with no husband present, 6.2% had a male householder with no wife present, and 33.3% were non-families. 27.2% of all households were made up of individuals, and 13.6% had someone living alone who was 65 years of age or older. The average household size was 2.51 and the average family size was 3.11.

The median age in the city was 36.8 years. 30.5% of residents were under the age of 18; 7.5% were between the ages of 18 and 24; 24.6% were from 25 to 44; 23.2% were from 45 to 64; and 14.3% were 65 years of age or older. The gender makeup of the city was 52.2% male and 47.8% female.

2000 census
As of the census of 2000, there were 225 people, 94 households, and 59 families residing in the city. The racial makeup of the city was 95.11% White, 1.33% Native American, 2.22% from other races, and 1.33% from two or more races. Hispanic or Latino of any race were 4.44% of the population.

There were 94 households, out of which 37.2% had children under the age of 18 living with them, 50.0% were married couples living together, 7.4% had a female householder with no husband present, and 36.2% were non-families. 31.9% of all households were made up of individuals, and 20.2% had someone living alone who was 65 years of age or older. The average household size was 2.39 and the average family size was 3.10.

In the city, the population was spread out, with 27.6% under the age of 18, 7.6% from 18 to 24, 31.1% from 25 to 44, 16.0% from 45 to 64, and 17.8% who were 65 years of age or older. The median age was 36 years. For every 100 females, there were 94.0 males. For every 100 females age 18 and over, there were 89.5 males.

As of 2000 the median income for a household in the city was $36,563, and the median income for a family was $42,917. Males had a median income of $29,063 versus $25,000 for females. The per capita income for the city was $16,319. About 9.3% of families and 9.6% of the population were below the poverty line, including 6.1% of those under the age of eighteen and 18.0% of those 65 or over.

Government
The Lincolnville government consists of a mayor and five council members.  The council meets the 1st Monday of each month at 7PM.
 City Hall, 218 W Main St.
 Fire Department, 307 W Main St.
 Police Department.
 U.S. Post Office, 319 S Adams St.

Education
The community is served by Centre USD 397 public school district.  The high school is a member of T.E.E.N., a shared video teaching network between five area high schools.
 Centre School; 2374 310th St, Lost Springs, KS; between Lost Springs and Lincolnville, east of U.S. 77 highway.

Media

Print
 Marion County Record, local newspaper from Marion.
 Hillsboro Free Press, free newspaper for greater Marion County area.

Infrastructure

Transportation
The U.S. Route 77 highway runs through the east side of Lincolnville and almost parallel to the Union Pacific Railroad which is about 5 blocks west of the highway.

Utilities
 Internet
 Fiber Optics is provided by TCT.
 Satellite is provided by HughesNet, StarBand, WildBlue.
 TV
 Fiber Optics is provided by TCT.
 Cable is provided by Eagle Communications.
 Satellite is provided by DirecTV, Dish Network.
 Terrestrial is provided by regional digital TV stations.
 Telephone
 Fiber Optics is provided by TCT.
 Electricity
 Rural is provided by Flint Hills RECA.

See also
 Centre High School
 National Register of Historic Places listings in Marion County, Kansas
 Historical Maps of Marion County, Kansas

References

Further reading

External links

City
 
 Lincolnville - Directory of Public Officials, League of Kansas Municipalities
Historic
 Marion County cemetery list, archive of KsGenWeb
 Marion County history bibliography,  Marion County school bibliography, Kansas Historical Society
Maps
 Lincolnville city map, KDOT
 Topo Map of Lincolnville / Antelope area, USGS

Cities in Kansas
Cities in Marion County, Kansas
Populated places established in 1860